Ye Gavi (also Romanized as Ye Gāvī; also known as Yegā’ī, Yeka’i, Yek Gāvī, and Zīnābād) is a village in Susan-e Gharbi Rural District, Susan District, Izeh County, Khuzestan Province, Iran. At the 2006 census, its population was 41, in 9 families.

References 

Populated places in Izeh County